Toyota Auto Body California (TABC) is a manufacturing plant in Long Beach, California, located at 6375 North Paramount Boulevard. Established in 1972, TABC was the first Toyota plant in North America. A subsidiary of Toyota Motor North America, the plant occupies .

The plant produces sheet metal and aluminum components, weld subassemblies, steering columns, catalytic converters, and painted service parts for Toyota's North American manufacturing facilities, for export to Toyota's facilities in Japan, and for Tesla, along with producing catalytic converters and numerous past model service parts for Toyota Motor North America.

History 
The plant was established to circumvent the chicken tax, a 25 percent tariff on light trucks imposed in 1964 by the United States under President Lyndon B. Johnson in response to tariffs placed by France and West Germany on importation of U.S. chicken. While the government said the tariff was meant to curtail importation of German-built Volkswagen Type 2s, other models were also impacted, including the Toyota Hilux (also known as the Toyota Pickup). Toyota found a tariff engineering loophole: they could import "chassis cab" configurations (which included the entire truck, less the truck bed) with only a 4% tariff. When the trucks arrived in the United States, a truck bed would subsequently be attached to the chassis before being sent to dealers.

To enable this work, Toyota struck a deal in 1971 with Atlas Fabricators, which would produce the truck beds starting in November. The plant was Toyota's first manufacturing investment in the United States.

On , the California plant was renamed TABC, Inc. (Toyota Auto Body California), a nod to the company's Toyota Auto Body manufacturing subsidiary.

Toyota would later say that TABC had a large role in building Toyota's pickup trucks into a major model in the U.S. on the same level as the Corolla and the Camry. In 1984, Toyota would establish with GM a joint-venture vehicle manufacturing plant called NUMMI which would begin assembling complete Hilux trucks in the United States starting in 1991.

Between 2004 and 2008, TABC was the assembly location for the first, U.S.-produced Hino commercial truck.

, the plant produces sheet metal and aluminum components, weld subassemblies, steering columns, catalytic converters, and painted service parts for Toyota's North American manufacturing facilities, for export to Toyota's facilities in Japan, and for Tesla, along with producing catalytic converters and numerous past model service parts for Toyota Motor North America.

References

External links
 

1972 establishments in California
Companies based in Long Beach, California
Manufacturing companies based in Greater Los Angeles
Motor vehicle assembly plants in California
Toyota factories
Vehicle manufacturing companies established in 1972